Lumding (Pron:/lʌmˈdɪŋ/)  is a city with municipal board in Hojai District in the Indian state of Assam.

Etymology

The word 'Lumding' owes its roots to a couple of Dimasa words 'Lama' and 'Ding' connoting 'straight pathway'. The word Lumding is also believed to be from karbi words 'loom' means the 'water from cloud' and 'ding' meaning 'scarcity or Nil'. There's another Railway station adjacent to it with the same root word "Lama" (Path), it is Lamasakhong (Valley of the small pathways) which is just a few kilometers away from Lumding.

History

Over the years Lumding has developed into township. The railway township had always enjoyed scant rainfall during the rainy season every year, although the trend has significantly altered over the past few decades. Lumding was also used as a radar station during World War II by the British.

Transport

Railway

Lumding railway division is famous for being the biggest divisional headquarters of the Northeast Frontier Railway and the biggest junction in the North-Eastern part of the country. The town is also the gateway to the visually enchanting Lumding-Badarpur hill-tract between Lumding and Badarpur. The track has been included as a UNESCO World Heritage Site.

 is an important railway junction and railway division in the Northeast Frontier Railway as it connects Tripura to Assam. It used to have both metre gauge and broad gauge. The BG line is of Guwahati–Lumding–Dibrugarh Town and the MG line was the Lumding–Sabroom section. Now BG line is made from Silchar/Sabroom via Lumding to Kolkata as new constructions. MG lines are now completely replaced with BG.

Roadways

Lumding is connected by NH 27 four-lane, which starts at Porbandar, Gujarat ends at Silchar (6 hrs.journey) via Lumding. Guwahati (2.5 hrs. journey) connected near Borghat Roundabout which is 5 km apart from Nagaon Sadar. State Highway 329 connects Lumding to Diphu (District Headquarter of Karbi Ang Long East).

Lumding, Lanka, Doboka, Hojai, Bheluguri, Borghat. Borghat Roundabout has four diversions to Guwahati, towards Lumding-Silchar, towards Tezpur and towards Nagaon.

Lumding-Silchar four-lane further diverted to Numuligarh near Doboka.

Education 

The town Lumding has a number of secondary schools and high schools like Lumding Assamese High School, Saraswati Gurukul High School, Pranabananda Vidyamandir,  Railway Higher Secondary School, Don Bosco High School, B.M.B high school, Kendriya Vidyalaya, Dakshin Lumding Vidya Niketan, Pranab Vidyapith, National Higher Secondary School, East Lumding High School, Bir Kanaklata L.P. School, BLBSDV Hindi High School, Shankar Dev School etc. Preschools like kidzee are also there. Institutes of dance, music, martial arts, drama, mental education like chess etc are also very known here these days and the instructors of these institutions are also nationally claimed.

The town has the oldest established college named Lumding College, established in 1959, affiliated to the Gauhati University and newly opened "Womens' College", which is under Bharat Sevashram Sangha.

Apart from primary education, Lumding town is also a place for coaching centres for competitive exams of medical, engineering, banks, polytechnic, UPSC, SSC etc. Computer institutes are also abundant in number.

Politics 

Lumding is part of Nowgong (Lok Sabha constituency).

Biresh Mishra and Debesh Chakraborty was the eminent political leader from the place during 70s, 80s, 90s and 2k.

Religion 
According to the official census of 2011, Lumding has a population of 31,347 in which Hinduism is the majority religion in Lumding followed by around 30,479 peoples. Islam, Christianity, Buddhism, Sikhism and Jainism have a negligible population in Lumding.

Geography, cultures, and people 

Lumding is a mixture of town, village and city.  On the path to Upper Assam, Lumding enjoys a hilly, subterranean landscape with dense reserve forests bounding it from all sides. In the south of it are the magnificent North Cachar Hills.

Haflong, The only hill station of Assam is a close destination from Lumding. The region sports small rivers through its hilly terrain and are beautiful to watch during the rainy seasons. Rivers form a major part for the agricultural practices in Lumding and nearby villages to it.

Lumding is a place of almost all indian religions and languages. People are very friendly and helpful. Festivals like Bihu, Durga Puja, Sitala Puja, Janmashtmi, Magha Purnima, Ratha Yatra, Van mahotsav, Eid, Christmas, Buddha Purnima or (Vesak in other countries), Baisakhi etc festivals of different religions are also celebrated grandly.

Climate

Hills of Lumding puts it to a notable altitude from the sea level, but summers here can burn you up to 40 °C and the winters can be as chilling as 4-5 °C with fog and mist intervening in the early hours of the day. Monsoon is a notable season here, with rainfall around 60–125mm at an average. But its hills and altitude prevents any flooding in the region during heavy monsoon.

Climate here is favorable for vegetation and agriculture of tropical fruits and vegetables. Fruits like coconuts, pineapple, jack-fruit, papaya, banana are grown here. Cucumber, potatoes, cabbages and other green vegetables are common agricultural vegetables here.

See also 
 Lumding Vidhan Sabha

References

 
Cities and towns in Hojai district